The 1921 Dudley by-election was held on 3 March 1921.  The by-election was held due to the appointment of the incumbent Coalition Conservative MP, Arthur Griffith-Boscawen, as Minister of Agriculture and Fisheries.  It was won by the Labour candidate James Wilson.  It was one of only eight ministerial by-elections in the UK to not be retained by the incumbent.

References

1921 in England
1921 elections in the United Kingdom
Politics of Dudley
By-elections to the Parliament of the United Kingdom in Worcestershire constituencies
By-elections to the Parliament of the United Kingdom in West Midlands (county) constituencies
20th century in Worcestershire